The National Republican Party (NRP) was a right-wing political party in Guyana.

History
The party was established in 1990 following a split in the United Republican Party. In the 1992 general elections it received just 114 votes and failed to win a seat. The party did not contest any further elections, and merged into the National Front Alliance on 1 December 2000.

References

Defunct political parties in Guyana
1990 establishments in Guyana
2000 disestablishments in Guyana
Political parties established in 1990
Political parties disestablished in 2000